Dan Kamau is from a Kenyan family of five. He attended Kenyatta University and graduated with a BA.

Kamau is the author of Gambling with Destiny, which was inspired by attacks on tourists in northern Uganda. He has also written the book, DayDreamer, and is the founder of Jamhuri magazine.

References

External links

Kenyan writers
Kenyan male writers
Year of birth missing (living people)
Living people
Kenyatta University alumni
Magazine founders